Calytrix watsonii is a species of plant in the myrtle family Myrtaceae that is endemic to Western Australia.

Found in a scattered area from the eastern Mid West region near Wiluna south into the Goldfields-Esperance region of Western Australia around Menzies where it grows in sandy and gravelly soils.

Taxonomy
The plant was initially described by Ferdinand von Mueller and Ralph Tate in 1896 as Calycothrix watsonii, and was transferred in 1931 to the genus, Calytrix, by Charles Austin Gardner.

References

watsonii
Endemic flora of Western Australia
Rosids of Western Australia
Taxa named by Ferdinand von Mueller
Plants described in 1896
Taxa named by Ralph Tate